The Lord of the Beasts is a 1921 German silent drama film directed by Ernst Wendt and starring Carl de Vogt, Cläre Lotto, and Anna von Palen. It premiered in Berlin on 17 August 1921.

Cast

References

Bibliography

External links

 

1921 films
Films of the Weimar Republic
German silent feature films
German drama films
Films directed by Ernst Wendt
1921 drama films
German black-and-white films
Silent drama films
1920s German films